The Invisible Men is a songwriting and music production trio consisting of Jason Pebworth, George Astasio and Jon Shave. Invisible Men's songs have so far achieved over 7 billion Spotify streams, 30 million record sales worldwide and the trio has frequently ranked among Music Week's Top Songwriters. They co-produced and co-composed Iggy Azalea's seven week US #1 single "Fancy" (featuring Charli XCX) which has sold in excess of 11 million copies digitally worldwide to date, making it one of the best-selling singles of all time and the seventh best-selling single worldwide of 2014. As well as her US million-selling debut single, "Work", and a vast portion of Azalea's debut album The New Classic. The Invisible Men as IIVI co-produced six of the seven tracks on Lil Peep's 2017 album "Come Over When You're Sober Pt. 1", as well as the majority of its follow-up "Pt. 2", alongside other stand-alone tracks including          "Falling Down" (with XXXTentacion), I've Been Waiting (with iLoveMakonnen) and When I Lie (Remix) (with Ty Dolla Sign).

Career 
Before The Invisible Men were formed in 2008 Jason Pebworth and George Astasio were members of Orson, who sold over a million copies of their debut album, reached No. 1 in both the UK singles and album charts, and received the Brit Award for Best Breakthrough Act 2007.  Jon Shave was a member of Xenomania in the early 2000s, contributing to a string of top 10 hit singles, including co-writing "The Show" for Girls Aloud.

The Invisible Men's songwriting and production catalogue includes international hits such as Riton's 2021 multi-platinum global smash Friday (Dopamine Re-edit), Becky Hill & Sigala's Heaven On My Mind, Sigala's Say You Do (UK top 5) and Just Got Paid, DJ Fresh's UK No. 1 hit "Hot Right Now" (featuring Rita Ora), No. 3 hit "Dibby Dibby Sound" (featuring Ms Dynamite) and Conor Maynard's debut top 5 hits "Can't Say No" and "Vegas Girl", Jessie J's hits "Do It Like A Dude", "LaserLight" (feat. David Guetta), "Who's Laughing Now?" and the Noisettes' "Don't Upset The Rhythm" and "Never Forget You".

In 2019 Invisible Men produced two Miley Cyrus songs for Netflix's Black Mirror episode "Rachel, Jack and Ashley Too".

IIVI 
As a side project, Invisible Men also produce under the name "IIVI".  IIVI have produced records for Lil Peep, Bexey and XXXTentacion.  Their sound has been described as "the 808s and rumbling basslines of trap music [combined] with the guitars of early 00s emo music to create an atmosphere that is at once hard-hitting yet bleak", mixing "emotive riffs with the slap of rap drums".

Discography 
Productions and co-writes:

References

External links 
 The Invisible Men on SoundCloud

British record producers